Estanislao Schillinsky Bachanska (10 August 1911 – 27 September 1985), known as Estanislao Shilinsky or simply Shilinsky, was a Lithuanian-born Mexican comedian and the half of the 1940–1970 comedy duo Manolín y Shilinsky with  ("Manolín").

Career
Estanislao Shilinsky and his brother moved to Mexico as members of a Russian circus troup.

His career started in the carpa circuit when he met Grigori Ivanov who introduced him to the Carpa Valentina that he owned. In 1929 he coached Mario Moreno and helped him improve his Cantinflas character. He later married Olga Subarev, the daughter of Ivanov, while Cantinflas married her sister Valentina Ivanova who the carpa was named after.

One of Shilinsky's singular characteristics as a Mexican actor was his remnant Russian accent.

His sidekick Manuel Palacio Sierra eventually lost his voice and died in poverty in 1977.

Filmography

As actor 
 Don't Fool Yourself Dear (1937)
 Jengibre vs Dinamita (1939)
 Cantinflas boxeador (1940) 
 Cantinflas y su prima (1940) 
 Here's the Point (1940)
 The Unknown Policeman (1941)
 Neither Blood nor Sand (1941)
 The Three Musketeers (1942)
 The Circus (1942)
 Gran Hotel (1944)
 I Am a Fugitive (1946)
 Fly Away, Young Man! (1947)
 Fíjate que suave (1948)
 Dos de la vida airada (1948)
 Pobres pero sinvergüenzas (1949)
 Vivillo desde chiquillo (1951)
 Las nenas del siete (1955)

As script writer 
 Cantinflas boxeador (1940) 
 Cantinflas y su prima (1940) 
 Siempre listo en las tinieblas (1939)

Portrayals 
Shilinsky was portrayed by Luis Gerardo Méndez in the 2014 film Cantinflas.

References

External links

1911 births
Lithuanian emigrants to Mexico
Mexican male comedians
Mexican male film actors
Mexican male stage actors
Deaths from emphysema
1985 deaths
People from Radviliškis District Municipality
20th-century Mexican male actors
20th-century comedians
20th-century Mexican screenwriters
20th-century Mexican male writers